Maha Sarakham, or Sarakham for short, may refer to
the town Maha Sarakham
Maha Sarakham Province
Maha Sarakham district
Maha Sarakham University
Maha Sarakham Rajabhat University (Rajabhat Maha Sarakham)
Sarakhampittayakhom School (Sarakham Pittayakhom)
Mahasarakham United F.C., a Thai football club